The 2005–06 season was Motherwell's 8th season in the Scottish Premier League, and their 21st consecutive season in the top division of Scottish football.

Squad
Updated 21 March 2011

Transfers

In

Out

Loans in

Released

Loans out

Competitions

Scottish Premier League

Classification

Results summary

Results by round

Results by opponent

Source: 2005–06 Scottish Premier League article

Results

Scottish Cup

Scottish League Cup

Statistics

Appearances
Updated 21 March 2011

 

|-
|colspan="14"|Players who appeared for Motherwell but left during the season:

|}

Top scorers
Last updated on 21 March 2011

Disciplinary record

Last updated 8 December 2010

See also
 List of Motherwell F.C. seasons

References

External links
 Motherwell Season 2005-06 - Fir Park Corner

2005-06
Scottish football clubs 2005–06 season